Duckett is a surname. Notable people with the surname include:

 Allen Bowie Duckett (1775–1809), American judge in the District of Columbia
 Ben Duckett (born 1994), English cricketer
 Bilal Duckett (Kevin Bilal Duckett, born 1989), American soccer player
 Catherine N. Duckett (born 1961), American entomologist
 Carl E. Duckett (1923–1992), American army officer, later CIA technical director
 Damane Duckett (born 1981), American football player
 Dick Duckett (Richard J. Duckett, 1933–2021), American basketball player
 Donald Duckett (1894–1970), English footballer, nephew of Horace
 Eleanor Duckett (1880–1976), British-American philologist and medieval historian, professor at Smith College
 George Duckett (Calne MP) (1632–1732), British lawyer, MP for Calne
 Sir George Duckett, 1st Baronet (1725–1822), born George Jackson, British politician
 Sir George Duckett, 2nd Baronet (1777–1856), British landowner and politician, son of the above
 Sir George Floyd Duckett, 3rd Baronet (1811–1902), English soldier and antiquarian, son of the above
 Horace Duckett (1867–1939), English international rugby union and rugby league player
 J. Fred Duckett (1933–2007), Texan sports announcer and teacher
 Jane Duckett, British political scientist 
 John Duckett (1613–1644), English Catholic priest and martyr
 John Duckett (Royalist) (1580–1684), English landowner, MP for Calne
 James Duckett (died 1601), English Catholic martyr
 James W. Duckett (1911–1991), United States Army officer, chemistry professor and President of The Citadel military college
 Kevin Duckett, Australian rugby league player
 LaFayette Duckett (1918–2018), American politician from Texas
 Lionel Duckett (1511–1587), British merchant, Lord Mayor of London
 Lionel Duckett (died 1609) (c.1577–1609), MP for Calne 1601–1604
 Lionel Duckett (died 1693) (1652–1693), MP for Calne 1679 and 1689
 Mahlon Duckett (1922–2015), American Negro league baseball infielder
 Melinda Duckett (1985–2006), mother of missing child Trenton Duckett
 Richard Duckett (disambiguation), several people
 Rick Duckett (born 1957), American basketball coach
 Stephen Duckett (born 1950), Australian economist and health services manager, former President and Chief Executive Officer of Alberta Health Services
 Stephen Duckett (MP) (c.1548–1591), MP for Calne 1584–1588
 T. J. Duckett (born 1981), American football player
 Thasunda Duckett (born 1973), American business executive
 Thomas Duckett (1713–1766), MP for Calne 1754 and 1761
 William Duckett (disambiguation), several people
Fictional characters
Nurse Duckett, in the novel Catch-22